A with tilde (majuscule: Ã, minuscule: ã) is a letter of the Latin alphabet formed by addition of the tilde diacritic over the letter A. It is used in Portuguese, Guaraní, Kashubian, Taa, Aromanian, and Vietnamese. In the past, it was also used in Greenlandic.

Usage 
In Portuguese, it represents a nasal near-open central vowel ([ɐ̃]), though it varies from near-open to mid-central vowel according to dialect. It also appears as a part of the diphthongs ãe, pronounced as /ɐ̃j̃/, and ão, pronounced as /ɐ̃w̃/.

In Kashubian, the letter is generally pronounced as nasalized open front unrounded vowel ([ã]). In the dialect present in counties of Puck and Wejherowo, it is pronounced as nasalized open-mid front unrounded vowel ([ɛ̃]). Its the 3rd letter of the Kashubian alphabet.

In Guaraní and Taa, it is pronounced as nasalized open front unrounded vowel ([ã]).

In Aromanian, it is pronounced as mid-central vowel ([ə]) or close central unrounded vowel ([ɨ]).

In Vietnamese, it is pronounced as long open front unrounded vowel ([aː]) in a high breaking-rising tone.

It is also used as a phonetic symbol in the International Phonetic Alphabet, where its lower case (ã), represents the nasalized open front unrounded vowel.

Formerly, the letter was also used in the Greenlandic to represent long open front unrounded vowel ([aː]) next to a geminated consonant, but now it is replaced with Aa.

The letter is also used in Belter Creole, a constructed language made by Nick Farmer for The Expanse television sci-fi series. In the language, it represents the nasalized near-open front unrounded vowel ([æ̃]) sound, for example in the word shãsa, which means chance.

Encoding

References 

Latin letters with diacritics
Phonetic transcription symbols
Aromanian language
Portuguese language